The Antisemitic League of France was founded in 1889 by journalist Edouard Drumont, with the support of other right-wing French antisemites such as Jacques de Biez, Albert Millot, and Marquis de Morès.

Beside spreading anti-Semitic propaganda, the League was also anti-Masonry and anti-Communist. It had as general delegates Jacques de Biez. Jules Guérin was an active member of it. The League was located on rue Lepic in Paris.

Its 1889 foundation was inspired by the success of Drumont's antisemitic pamphlet La France juive (1886), and also by the Boulangist crisis. It was supported by newspapers such as Drumont's La Libre Parole; Jules Guérin's French weekly L'Antijuif (fr) (Paris, 1896-1902); the daily La Cocarde (fr) (1888-1907) founded by Georges de Labruyère (fr) and edited September 1894 - March 1895 by Maurice Barrès; Henri Rochefort's L'Intransigeant; and the Catholic newspaper La Croix.

Beside propaganda, the League also organized antisemitic demonstrations and provoked some riots, a method later generalized by the far-right leagues in France. It denounced the Panama scandals, took side against Alfred Dreyfus and spread conspiracy theories concerning the Masonry's alleged activities in the Third Republic.

After a disagreement between Drumont and Guérin in 1899, the League became, under the direction of Guérin, the Grand Occident de France, still antisemitic but even more anti-Masonic, the name itself being a reaction against the Masonic Grand Orient de France. It was thereafter essentially linked to Guérin's newspaper, L'Antijuif. The League progressively disappeared after the "Fort Chabrol" affair and the arrest of Guérin. After an initial surge during the Dreyfus Affair, far right leagues appeared again during the interwar period.

See also 
Dreyfus Affair
Édouard Drumont
Far right leagues in France

References

Anti-communist organizations
French far right leagues
French nationalism
Anti-Masonry
Antisemitism in France
Organizations established in 1889
Dreyfus affair